John Finn (born 20 November 1963) is an Irish former Gaelic footballer. At club level he played with Mayo Gaels and was also a member of the Mayo senior football team.

Career

Finn started his Gaelic football as a schoolboy at Facefield National School before further developing at St Colman's College in Claremorris. He captained the college's senior team to the Connacht Colleges SFC title in 1981.  By this stage, Finn had also started playing ata dult level with the Mayo Gaels club. He won a Mayo IFC title in 1984.

Finn first appeared for Mayo as a member of the minor team that won the Connacht MFC title in 1980. He was later drafted onto the under-21 team and, as well as winning consecutive Connacht U21FC titles, also claimed an All-Ireland U21FC medal in 1983. Finn joined the senior team in 1984 and was a mainstay of the team for over a decade.  During that time, he won five Connacht SFC medals and was at left wing-back when Mayo were beaten by Cork in the 1989 All-Ireland final.

Honours

St. Colman's College
Connacht Colleges Senior Football Championship: 1981

Mayo Gaels
Mayo Intermediate Football Championship: 1984

Mayo
Connacht Senior Football Championship: 1985, 1988, 1989, 1992, 1993
National Football League Division 2: 1985–86
All-Ireland Under-21 Football Championship: 1983
Connacht Under-21 Football Championship: 1983, 1984, 1985
Connacht Minor Football Championship: 1980

References

1963 births
Living people
Irish salespeople
Mayo Gaels Gaelic footballers
Mayo inter-county Gaelic footballers